Liudmila Andreyevna Privivkova (born 13 September 1986 in Moscow; also spelled Ludmila or Liudmilla, but she spells it Liudmila) is a curler (Skip) from Russia.

At the 2006 Winter Olympics, in Turin, Italy, she was the skip for the Russian team.  Apart from the national team, she plays for the Moskvitch Curling Club, from Moscow.  She won the World Junior Curling Championships in Jeonju, Korea on 19 March 2006 and the 2006 European Curling Championships in December the same year.

Her team also qualified for the 2007 World Women's Curling Championship, but did not enjoy the same success as in the European tournament, finishing tied for 8th place with a 4-7 record.

She qualified for her third world championship in 2008.

Teammates
2010 Vancouver Olympic Games

Anna Sidorova, Third

Nkeiruka Ezekh, Second

Ekaterina Galkina, Lead

Margarita Fomina, Alternate

Grand Slam record

Key
 C – Champion
 F – Lost final
 SF – Lost semi final
 QF – Lost quarter final
 Q – Did not make playoffs
 DNP – Did not participate in event
 N/A – not a Grand Slam event that season

References

External links

1986 births
Living people
Russian female curlers
Curlers from Moscow
Curlers at the 2006 Winter Olympics
Olympic curlers of Russia
Curlers at the 2010 Winter Olympics
Medalists at the 2007 Winter Universiade
Russian curling champions
European curling champions
Universiade medalists in curling
Universiade silver medalists for Russia
Universiade bronze medalists for Russia
Competitors at the 2007 Winter Universiade
Competitors at the 2009 Winter Universiade
Competitors at the 2011 Winter Universiade